Jessica Anna Michalik (7 January 1985 – 31 January 2001) was an Australian girl from Sydney, born to Polish immigrants, who died as a result of asphyxiation five days after being crushed in a mosh pit during the 2001 Big Day Out music festival during a performance by headlining act Limp Bizkit.

Incident

The Coroner's Court of New South Wales findings into her death criticized the crowd control measures in use at the time, as well as Limp Bizkit lead singer Fred Durst for his "alarming and inflammatory" comments during the rescue effort. Michalik's family and her best friend Liza Ryan have maintained that it was a series of factors that contributed to Michalik's death and that no one party was to blame.

The band At the Drive-In had taken exception to the vigorous moshing during their performance earlier that day. Their lead singer Cedric Bixler-Zavala addressed the crowd at the conclusion of their song Cosmonaut, saying "I think it's a very very sad day when the only way you can express yourself is through slamdancing". Then after pointing at an audience member crowd surfing, he continued "look at that... you didn't learn that from your best friend! You learned that from the TV!",  and finally told the crowd "You're a robot, you're a sheep" before bleating at them several times and leaving the stage around 10 minutes into their set.

The band Grinspoon (Michalik's favourite) performed at her funeral, and a "minute of noise" tribute has been observed at subsequent Big Day Out festivals. Limp Bizkit paid tribute to Michalik during their Soundwave 2012 performances, which included performing under a banner with Jessica's name on it during the Brisbane leg.

References

Further reading
Comments by an event manager about Coronial Inquest Report (in pdf format)
The Jessica Michalik Contemporary Music Endowment (in pdf format)
A big thumbs up for troubled Big Day Out, Sydney Morning Herald, 11 November 2002
Insurers sue over death, The Age, 13 August 2005
Anna Cock, "Jessica's tragedy — Thoughtful girl with a passion for rock bands", 2 February 2001, The Daily Telegraph, Surry Hills (Sydney, Australia), pg 4.

1985 births
2001 deaths
Accidental deaths in New South Wales
Australian children
Australian people of Polish descent
Deaths from asphyxiation
People from Manly, New South Wales